Meshkenar (also Romanized as Meshkenār; also known as Mashganār) is a village in Qaleh Shahin Rural District, in the Central District of Sarpol-e Zahab County, Kermanshah Province, Iran. At the 2006 census, its population was 393, in 89 families.

References 

Populated places in Sarpol-e Zahab County